Lindau-Aeschach station is a railway station in the Aeschach district in the town of Lindau, located in Bavaria, Germany.

References

Aeschach
Buildings and structures in Lindau (district)